The Death of Willie Lynch is the debut album released by Black Ice, an African-American rapper and poet. Although originally signed to Def Jam Records, Black Ice was thankful to have this album released by the indie label Koch Records. Eric "Booty" Greene handled the production for this album.

The title refers to the William Lynch Speech.

Track listing

Personnel

See also
 Russell Simmons' Def Poetry Jam

References

External links
 Black Ice on MySpace
 KOCH Records
 Def Poetry Jam
 Def Poetry Jam on HBO

2006 debut albums
Hip hop albums by American artists